Ádám Ficsor (born 17 June 1980) is a Hungarian politician, who served as Minister of Civilian Intelligence Services of Hungary in 2009. He was a part of Ferenc Gyurcsány's inner circle in the Hungarian Socialist Party.

In 2011 he joined Democratic Coalition Platform founded by Gyurcsány and became a member of its leadership. When the platform split from the Socialist Party on October 22, 2011 he joined to newly formed party and left the MSZP and its parliamentary group.

References

External links
 Biográf ki kicsoda (Budapest, 2003)
 Hivatalos életrajza az MSZP honlapján

1980 births
Living people
Secret ministers of Hungary
Hungarian Socialist Party politicians
Democratic Coalition (Hungary) politicians
Members of the National Assembly of Hungary (2010–2014)
Members of the Bajnai Government